Hallettsville Independent School District is a public school district based in Hallettsville, Texas (USA).

Located in Lavaca County, very small portions of the district extend into Colorado and Jackson counties.

In 2009, the school district was rated "academically acceptable" by the Texas Education Agency.

Schools
Hallettsville High School (Grades 9-12) (in addition, high school students from the neighboring Sweet Home Independent School District, Vysehrad Independent School District, and Ezzell Independent School District have the option to attend here)
Hallettsville Junior High School (Grades 5-8)
Hallettsville Elementary School (Grades PK-4)

History

Other Information
Boys' Mascot: Brahmas
Girls' Mascot: Lady Brahmas
School Colors: Maroon and White

State Championships
1994-1995: Baseball (Conference 3A), Coach: Jimmy Appelt
1996-1997: Baseball (Conference 3A), Coach: Jimmy Appelt
2012-2013: Baseball (Conference 2A), Coach: Shorty Cook
2021-2022: Softball (Conference 3A), Coach: Callie Kresta

State Appearances
1976-1977: Football (Conference 2A), State Semifinalists
1991-1992: Baseball (Conference 3A), State Semifinalists, Coach: Jimmy Appelt
1994-1995: Baseball (Conference 3A), State Champions, Coach: Jimmy Appelt
1996-1997: Baseball (Conference 3A), State Champions, Coach: Jimmy Appelt
1997-1998: Baseball (Conference 3A), State Semifinalists, Coach: Jimmy Appelt
2008-2009: Softball (Conference 2A), State Finalists, Coach: Mike Mikeska
2009-2010: Boys' Basketball (Conference 2A), State Semifinalists, Coach: Rich Dozier
2010-2011: Boys' Basketball (Conference 2A), State Semifinalists, Coach: Rich Dozier
2012-2013: Baseball (Conference 2A), State Champions, Coach: Shorty Cook
2013-2014: Girls' Basketball (Conference 2A), State Semifinalists, Coach: Amy Powell
2014-2015: Softball (Conference 3A), State Finalists, Coach: Mike Mikeska
2018-2019: Softball (Conference 3A), State Finalists, Coach: Mike Mikeska
2020-2021: Football (Conference 3A), State Finalists, Coach: Tommy Psencik
2021-2022: Softball (Conference 3A), State Champions, Coach: Callie Kresta

References

External links
Hallettsville ISD

School districts in Lavaca County, Texas
School districts in Colorado County, Texas
School districts in Jackson County, Texas
School districts in Washington County, Texas
School districts established in 1907